Potter–Allison Farm is a historic farm complex and national historic district located at Potter Township, Centre County, Pennsylvania.  The district includes nine contributing buildings and one contributing site in Centre Hall.  The district includes the Potter–Allison House, 19th century wood barn, and a variety of outbuildings including a hog barn, equipment buildings, corn crib, stone slaughterhouse, and a springhouse.  Also on the property are the remains of milling and tanning operations.  The Georgian-style house was built about 1817, with a Victorian addition dating to the 1850s. It is a 2 1/2-story brick dwelling.  The property was originally owned and developed by General James Potter (1729–1789), who built a log cabin and grist mill.  The property was acquired by the locally prominent Allison family in 1849.

It was added to the National Register of Historic Places in 1977.

References

Historic districts on the National Register of Historic Places in Pennsylvania
Georgian architecture in Pennsylvania
Buildings and structures in Centre County, Pennsylvania
1817 establishments in Pennsylvania
National Register of Historic Places in Centre County, Pennsylvania
Farms on the National Register of Historic Places in Pennsylvania